The Hipp's Superbirds J-3 Kitten and related designs are a family of single-engined, single seat, high wing conventional landing gear-equipped aircraft available in kit form or as plans from Hipp's Superbirds of Saluda, North Carolina.

The J-3, J-4 and Reliant designs are intended to have empty weights under , and fit into the US ultralight category. The remaining designs are heavier and fit into the US Experimental - Amateur-built category.

Design and development
The Hipp's J-3, J-5 and Reliant are all very similar aircraft developed from the original J-4, and differing only in fuselage design and wingspan.

All aircraft in the series have a 4130 steel tube fuselage and tail assembly. The wings are built from wood, and both the fuselage and wings are covered with doped aircraft fabric. The engine cowlings are composite. Floats and skis are available. Construction times are estimated as 300 hours from the kit and 800 hours from plans.

The wings of all the aircraft in the series are detachable for transport or storage.

The aircraft in the series are described by reviewer Andre Cliche as being "docile, predictable and forgiving aircraft that can be handled safely by novice pilots."

Operational history
The Reliant was first displayed at Oshkosh in 1987 where it received the Grand Champion and Charles Lindbergh awards.

Variants
J-3 Kitten
First flight 1986.
J-4 Sportster
First flight 1986.

J-5 Super Kitten
First flight 1986. Includes extra fuel, landing gear shock absorbers, wheel pants and brakes.
Super Sportster
First flight 1986.
Reliant
First flight 1987.

Reliant SX
Includes extra fuel, landing gear shock absorbers, and wheel pants. First flight 1987.

Specifications (J-3 Kitten)

See also

References

External links
Photo of J-3 Kitten

Aircraft manufactured in the United States
1980s United States ultralight aircraft